Zhelev is a surname. Notable people with the surname include:

Iliya Zhelev (born 1961), Bulgarian painter
Mikhail Zhelev (born 1943), Bulgarian athlete
Ventsislav Zhelev (born 1980), Bulgarian footballer
Zhelyo Zhelev (born 1987), Bulgarian footballer
Zhelyu Zhelev (1935-2015), Bulgarian politician
Zhivko Zhelev (born 1979), Bulgarian footballer

Bulgarian-language surnames